In Shia Islam, the Imamah is a doctrine which asserts that certain individuals from the lineage of the Islamic prophet Muhammad are to be accepted as leaders and guides of the ummah after the death of Muhammad. Imamah further says that Imams possess divine knowledge and authority (Ismah) as well as being part of the Ahl al-Bayt, the family of Muhammad. These Imams have the role of providing commentary and interpretation of the Quran as well as guidance.

Etymology 
The word "Imām" denotes a person who stands or walks "in front". For Sunni Islam, the word is commonly used to mean a person who leads the course of prayer in the mosque. It also means the head of a madhhab ("school of thought"). However, from the Shia point of view this is merely the basic understanding of the word in the Arabic language and, for its proper religious usage, the word "Imam" is applicable only to those members of the house of Muhammad designated as infallible by the preceding Imam.

Introduction 
The Shia further believe only these A'immah have the right to be Caliphs, meaning that all other caliphs, whether elected by consensus (Ijma) or not, are usurpers of the Caliphate as those were political positions not divine positions.

All Muslims believe that Muhammad had said: "To whomsoever I am Mawla, Ali is his Mawla." This hadith has been narrated in different ways by many different sources in no less than 45 hadith books of both Sunni and Shia collections. This hadith has also been narrated by the collector of hadiths, al-Tirmidhi, 3713; as well as Ibn Maajah, 121; etc. The major point of conflict between the Sunni and the Shia is in the interpretation of the word 'Mawla'. For the Shia the word means 'Master' and has the same elevated significance as when the term had been used to address Muhammad himself during his lifetime. Thus, when Muhammad actually (by speech) and physically (by way of having his closest companions including Abu Bakr, Umar and Uthman [the three future Caliphs who had preceded Ali as Caliph] publicly accept Ali as their Master by taking Ali's hand in both of theirs as token of their allegiance to Ali) transferred this title and manner of addressing Ali as the Mawla for all Muslims at Ghadiri Khum Oasis just a few months before his death, the people that came to look upon Ali as Muhammad's immediate successor even before Muhammad's death came to be known as the Shia. However, for Sunnis the word simply means the 'beloved' or the 'revered' and has no other significance at all.

Sects 

Within Shia Islam (Shiism), the various sects came into being because they differed over their Imams' successions, just as the Shia – Sunni separation within Islam itself came into being from the dispute that had arisen over the succession to Muhammad. Each succession dispute brought forth a different tariqah (literal meaning 'path'; extended meaning 'sect') within Shiism. Each Shia tariqah followed its own particular Imam's dynasty, resulting in different numbers of Imams for each particular Shia tariqah. When the dynastic line of the separating successor Imam ended with no heir to succeed him, then either he (the last Imam) or his unborn successor was believed to have gone into a concealment known as The Occultation.

The Shia tariqah with a majority of adherents are the Twelvers who are commonly known as "Shia". After that come the Nizari Ismailis commonly known as the Ismailis, then the Mustalian Ismailis also called the "Bohras", and there are further schisms within their Bohri tariqah. The Druze tariqah initially were part of the Fatimid Ismailis but separated from them after the death of the Fatimid Imam and Caliph Al Hakim Bi Amrillah. The Shia Sevener tariqah no longer exists. Another small tariqah is that of the Zaidi Shias, or the "Fivers;" they do not believe in the Occultation of their last Imam.

Although all these different Shia tariqahs belong to the Shia (as opposed to the Sunni) sect in Islam, there are major doctrinal differences between the main Shia tariqahs. After that there is the complete doctrinal break between all the different Shia tariqahs whose last Imams have gone into Occultation and the Shia Nizari Ismailis, who deny the concept of Occultation and so have to have a present and living Imam until the end of time.

Twelver view
 

Shias believe that Imamah is of the Principles of Faith (Usul al-Din).  As the verse 4:165 of Quran expresses the necessity to the appointment of the prophets; so after the demise of the prophet who will play the role of the prophet; until the people have not any plea against Allah.  The same logic that necessitated the assignment of prophets also is applied for Imamah.  That is Allah must assign someone similar to prophet in his attributes and Ismah as his successor to guide the people without any deviation in religion.

They refer to the verse ("...This day I have perfected for you your religion and completed My favor upon you and have approved for you Islam as religion...") 5:3 of Quran which was revealed to the prophet when he appointed Ali as his successor at the day of Ghadir Khumm.

By the verse Quran, 2:124, Shias believe that Imamah is a divine position always Imamah is accompanied by the word guidance, of course a guidance by God's Command. A kind of guidance which brings humanity to the goal. Regarding 17:71, no age can be without an Imam. So, according to the upper verse, 1. Imamah is a position which is appointed by God and must be specified by Him; 2. Imam is protected by a divine protection and no one excels him in nobility; 3. No age can be without an Imam and finally Imam knows everything which is needed for human being to get to the truth and goal.

Why only specific members of Muhammad's family?
This is why Muhammad did not nominate a successor, as he wanted to leave the succession to be resolved "by the Muslim Community on the basis of the Qur’anic principle of consultation". The question Madelung proposes here is why the family members of Muhammad should not inherit aspects of Muhammad's character, apart from prophethood, such as rule, wisdom, and leadership. Since the Sunni concept of the "true caliphate" itself defines it as a "succession of the Prophet in every respect except his prophethood", Madelung further asks, "If God really wanted to indicate that he should not be succeeded by any of his family, why did He not let his grandsons and other kin die like his sons?"

It is narrated that it is forbidden for the Divine Leader not to be from the family of Muhammad. According to Ali al-Ridha, since it is obligatory to obey him, there should be a sign to clearly indicate the Divine Leader. That sign is his well-known ties of kinship with Muhammad and his clear appointment so that the people could distinguish him from others, and be clearly guided toward him. Otherwise others are nobler than Muhammad's offspring and they are to be followed and obeyed; and the offspring of Muhammad are obedient and subject to the offspring of Muhammad's enemies such as Abi Jahl or Ibn Abi Ma’eet.However, Muhammad is much nobler than others to be in charge and to be obeyed.
Moreover, once the prophethood of Muhammad is testified they would obey him, no one would hesitate to follow his offspring and this would not be hard for anyone. While to follow the offspring of the corrupted families is difficult. And that is maybe why the basic characteristic of Muhammad and other prophets was their nobility. For none of them, it is said, were originated from a disgraced family. It is believed that all Muhammad's ancestors up to Adam were true Muslims.  Jesus was also from a pious family, as it is mentioned in Quran that after his birth, people said to Mary: "O sister of Aaron, your father was not a man of evil, nor was your mother unchaste."

The Ismā'īlī view

The doctrine of the Imamate in Isma'ilism differs from that of the Twelvers because the Isma'ilis had living Imams for centuries after the last Twelver Imam, Muhammad al-Mahdi went into hiding. They followed Isma'il ibn Jafar, elder brother of Musa al-Kadhim, as the rightful Imam after his father, Ja'far al-Sadiq. The Ismailis believe that whether Imam Ismail did or did not die before Imam Ja'far, he had passed on the mantle of the imamate to his son Muhammad ibn Isma'il as the next imam.

According to Isma'ilism, God has sent seven great prophets known as Nātiqs "Speaker" in order to disseminate and improve his dīn of Islam. All of these great prophets has also one assistant known as Sāmad "Silent" Imām. At the end of each seven Sāmad silsilas, one great Nātiq has been sent in order to improve the faith. After Adam and his son Seth, and after six Nātiq–Sāmad silsila (Noah–Shem), (Abraham–Ishmael), (Moses–Aaron), (Jesus–Simeon, son of Jacob), (Muhammad–Ali); the silsila of Nātiqs and Sāmads have been completed with Muhammad ibn Isma'il.

Why Imams from only (specific) family members
Ismailis view Imams as the true representative of God. God has made all prophets his representative. Individual prophets era are distinct. After one prophets God created next prophet. Islam view that Mohammed is last prophet. Mohammed appointed his specific representative Ali. Ali made imams as his next representative and one imam appointed another until date. The Isma'ili view that these Imam are only from their hereditary chain and their appointment is a must, and Earth cannot remain vacant, without presence of Imam.

Zaidi view

Zaidiyyah or Zaidi is a Shia madhhab (sect, school) named after the imam Zayd ibn Ali. Followers of the Zaidi fiqh are called Zaidis (or are occasionally called Fivers in the West). However, there is also a group called the Zaidi Wasītīs who are Twelvers.

In the context of the Shi'a Muslim belief in spiritual leadership or Imamate, Zaydis believe that the leader of the Ummah or Muslim community must be Fatimids: descendants of Muhammad through his only surviving daughter Fatimah, whose sons were Hasan ibn ʻAlī and Husayn ibn ʻAlī. These Shi'a called themselves Zaydi so they could differentiate themselves from other Shi'is who refused to take up arms with Zayd ibn Ali.

Zaydis believe Zayd ibn Ali was the rightful successor to the Imamate because he led a rebellion against the Umayyad Caliphate, who he believed were tyrannical and corrupt. Muhammad al-Baqir did not engage in political action and the followers of Zayd believed that a true Imām must fight against corrupt rulers. The renowned Muslim jurist Abu Hanifa who is credited for the Hanafi school of Sunni Islam, delivered a fatwā or legal statement in favour of Zayd in his rebellion against the Umayyad ruler. He also urged people in secret to join the uprising and delivered funds to Zayd.

Unlike Twelver Shi'ites, Zaydis do not believe in the infallibility of Imāms The Imamate can be passed down to anyone of the household of Muhammad.

The period of occultation

Twelver view

The period of occultation (ghaybah) is divided into two parts:

 Ghaybah al-Sughra or Minor Occultation (874–941), consists of the first few decades after the Imam's disappearance when communication with him was maintained through deputies of the Imam.
 Ghaybah al-Kubra or Major Occultation began in 941 and is believed to continue until a time decided by God, when the Mahdi will reappear to bring absolute justice to the world.

During the Minor Occultation (Ghaybah al-Sughrá), it is believed that al-Mahdi maintained contact with his followers via deputies (Arab. an-nuwāb al-arbaʻa or "the Four Leaders"). They represented him and acted as agents between him and his followers. Whenever the believers faced a problem, they would write their concerns and send them to his deputy. The deputy would ascertain his verdict, endorse it with his seal and signature and return it to the relevant parties. The deputies also collected zakat and khums on his behalf.

For the Shia, the idea of consulting a hidden Imam was not something new because the two prior Twelver Imams had, on occasion, met with their followers from behind a curtain. Also, during the oppressive rule of the later Abbasid caliphs, the Shia Imams were heavily persecuted and held prisoners, thus their followers were forced to consult their Imams via messengers or secretly.

Shia Tradition hold that four deputies acted in succession to one another:

 Uthman ibn Sa’id al-Asadi
 Abu Jafar Muhammad ibn Uthman
 Abul Qasim Husayn ibn Ruh al-Nawbakhti
 Abul Hasan Ali ibn Muhammad al-Samarri

In 941 (329 AH), the fourth deputy announced an order by al-Mahdi, that the deputy would soon die and that the deputyship would end and the period of the Major Occultation would begin.

The fourth deputy died six days later and the Shia Muslims continue to await the reappearance of the Mahdi. In the same year, many notable Shia scholars such as Ali ibn Babawayh Qummi and Muhammad ibn Ya'qub Kulayni, the learned compiler of Kitab al-Kafi, also died.

One view is that the Hidden Imam is on earth "among the body of the Shia" but "incognito". "Numerous stories" exist of the Hidden Imam "manifesting himself to prominent members of the ulama."

The Ismā'īlī view

The Ismailis differ from Twelvers because they had living imams for centuries after the last Twelver Imam went into concealment. They followed Isma'il ibn Jafar, elder brother of Musa al-Kadhim, as the rightful Imam after his father Ja'far al-Sadiq. The Ismailis believe that whether Imam Ismail did or did not die before Imam Ja'far, he had passed on the mantle of the imamate to his son Muḥammad ibn Ismail as the next imam. Thus, their line of imams is as follows (the years of their individual imamats during the Common Era are given in brackets):

First phase
The eighth Imam, Abd Allah al-Akbar of the Ismaili Shia remained hidden but continued the Ismaili movement in the 9th century in Salamiyah, Syria. The eighth to tenth Imams (Abadullah, Ahmed and Husain), remained hidden and worked for the movement against the period's time's rulers. First phase of seclusion ends with 10th Imam. The 11th Imam Abdullah al-Mahdi Billah, under the guise of being a merchant, and his son had made their way to Sijilmasa, fleeing persecution by the Abbasids. Imam Abdullah founded Fatimid Caliphate.  The Fatimid Ismaili Imams continued until 20th Imam holding the post of caliph also, ruling a vast part of Arabian peninsula.

Second phase
Upon the death of the twentieth Imam, al-Amir bi-Ahkami'l-Lah (d. ), his two-year-old child at-Tayyib Abu'l-Qasim (b. ) was appointed twenty-first Imam. The supporters of Tayyeb became the Tayyibi Ismāʿīlī.  As Tayyeb was not in position to run the dawah, Queen Arwa al-Sulayhi, the Da'i al-Mutlaq, acted as his regent.  Imam Tayyeb was hidden, and the second phase of seclusion started. The Da'i had now been given absolute authority and made independent from political activity.  With the period of time the Tayyibi divided further into several sects headed by different Dais. These Da'i al-Mutlaq continued acting on behalf of the hidden Tayyibi Ismāʿīlī Imams until date. Dawoodi Bohra is the biggest sub-sect amongst the Tayyibi Ismāʿīlī with a population spread over many countries.

Imams

Twelver Imams

According to the majority of Shī'a, namely the Twelvers (Ithnā'ashariyya), the following is a listing of the rightful successors to Muḥammad. Each Imam was the son of the previous Imam except for Hussayn ibn 'Alī, who was the brother of Hassan ibn 'Alī.The belief in this succession to Muḥammad stems from various Quranic verses which include: 75:36, 13:7, 35:24, 2:30, 2:124, 36:26, 7:142, 42:23. They support their discussion by citing Genesis 17:19–20 and Sunni hadith:Sahih Muslim, Hadith number 4478, English translation by Abdul Hamid Siddiqui.

List of The Twelve Imams

According to Twelvers, there is always an Imam of the era, who is the divinely appointed authority on all matters of faith and law in the Muslim community. Ali was the first of the Twelve Imams, and, in the Twelvers and Sufis' view, the rightful successor to Muhammad, followed by male descendants of Muhammad through his daughter Fatimah. Each Imam was the son of the previous Imam, with the exception of Husayn ibn Ali, who was the brother of Hasan ibn Ali. The twelfth and final Imam is Muhammad al-Mahdi, who is believed by the Twelvers to be currently alive, and hidden in the Major Occultation until he returns to bring justice to the world. It is believed by Twelver and Alevi Muslims that the Twelve Imams have been foretold in the Hadith of the Twelve Successors. All of the Imams met unnatural deaths, with the exception of the last Imam, who according to Twelver and Alevi belief, is living in occultation.

Ismaili Imams 

The Ismaili line of imams for both sects (the Nizari and Musta'li) continues undivided until al-Mustansir Billah (d. 1094). After his death the line of the imamat separates into the Nizari and Musta'li dynasties.

The line of imams of the Musta'li Muslims (also known as the Bohras/Dawoodi Bohra) continued up to Aamir ibn Mustali. After his death, they believe their 21st Imam, at-Tayyib Abu'l-Qasim went into a Dawr-e Satr (period of concealment) that continues to this day. In the absence of an imam they are led by a Da'i al-Mutlaq (absolute missionary) who manages the affairs of the Imam-in-Concealment until re-emergence of the Imam from concealment.

The line of imams of the Nizari Ismaili Shia Muslims (also known as the Agha-khani Ismailis in South and Central Asia) continues to their present living 49th hereditary imam, Aga Khan IV (son of Prince Aly Khan). They are the only Shia Muslim community today led by a present and living (Hazir wa Mawjud) imam.

Zaidi Imams 

The Zaidi branch of Shi'ism established its own line of Imams starting in the year 897; the line continued without interruption until 1962 when the North Yemen Civil War brought the Imamate to an end and established a republic.

Sunni view of the Shia Imamate 
Ibn Taymiyyah (d. 728 AH/1328 AD) composed a long refutation of the notion of the Imamate in his Minhaj as-Sunnah an-Nabawiyyah.

The belief of the Twelver Imamah with the consideration of the sacred status of the four Rashidun Caliphs is shared in Sunni Islam, due to the following hadith of Muhammad:

I heard the Prophet of Allah say 'Islam shall not cease to be glorious up to twelve Caliphs, every one of them being from the Quraish'". (And in a narration) "The affairs of men will not cease to decline so long as twelve men will rule over them, every one of them coming from Quraish. And in a narration: The religion will continue to be established till the hour comes as there are twelve Caliphs over them, everyone of them coming from the Quraish

The affairs of the people will continue to be conducted as long as they are governed by twelve men, he then added from Quraish

I will be followed by twelve Khalifas all will be Quraysh

Succession

See also 
Imams of Yemen
Imamzadeh
Ismah
Mahdi
Succession to Muhammad

Footnotes

Citations

References

External links 
Al-imamah (emamah) page 
A brief introduction of Twelve Imams
Shia Islam: History and Doctrines
Al-Muraja'at 
A Brief History Of The Lives Of The Twelve Imams a chapter of Shi'ite Islam (book) by Allameh Tabatabaei
"The Twelve Imams"—Taken from A Shi'ite Anthology by Allameh Tabatabaei
A Short History of the Lives of The Twelve Imams
Imamah in the Qur'an
"Imam"—An article by Encyclopædia Britannica Online
"Hojjat" by Maria Dakake, an entry in the Encyclopædia Iranica
Shia Islam – Ask Imam
Shia Network Ahlulbayt Discussion Forums
Twelve Successors
Bay Area Shiite-Muslims Association (basma.us)
Imamia Mission Bury
Graphical illustration of the Shia sects
The Shia Islamic Guide  (shiacode.com)
Imamah in Sunni Islam
Imamah according to Sunnis

Shia belief and doctrine
Islamic states by type
Islamic terminology
Imamate